Paula Serrano Castaño is a Spanish football midfielder, currently playing for Servette in the Swiss Nationalliga A.

Serrano played for Atlético Madrid in the Spanish First Division. In 2014, she moved to Torres Calcio of the Italian Serie A, returning to Spain a year later where she played for Granada CF.

In 2016, she signed with FC Neunkirch of the Swiss Nationalliga A.

As an Under-19 international she played the 2010 U-19 European Championship.

References

1991 births
Living people
Spanish women's footballers
Primera División (women) players
Serie A (women's football) players
Atlético Madrid Femenino players
Torres Calcio Femminile players
FC Neunkirch players
Expatriate women's footballers in Italy
Expatriate women's footballers in Switzerland
Women's association football midfielders
Servette FC Chênois Féminin players
Swiss Women's Super League players
Madrid CFF players
Spanish expatriate sportspeople in Switzerland
Spanish expatriate sportspeople in Italy
Spanish expatriate women's footballers
People from Plasencia
Sportspeople from the Province of Cáceres
Footballers from Extremadura